Giovanni Foresta (born 4 September 1995) is an Italian footballer who plays as a midfielder for  club Recanatese.

Career
A Crotone youth product, Foresta played all of his career at Serie C level. In 2017 he joined Carrarese, during which he was also promoted to captain by head coach Silvio Baldini, who often praised him for his attitude and commitment.

He left Carrarese in August 2022, after five seasons with the Tuscans, to join newly-promoted Serie C club Gelbison. On 1 February 2023, Foresta moved to Recanatese also in Serie C.

References

External links

1995 births
Living people
People from Catanzaro
Footballers from Calabria
Sportspeople from the Province of Catanzaro
Italian footballers
Association football midfielders
Serie C players
F.C. Crotone players
U.S. Catanzaro 1929 players
A.C.R. Messina players
Carrarese Calcio players
U.S.D. Recanatese 1923 players